Greg Johnston may refer to:

Greg Johnston (baseball) (born 1955), American baseball player
Greg Johnston (rower) (born 1959), New Zealand rower
Greg Johnston (ice hockey) (born 1965), Canadian ice hockey player

See also
Greg Johnson (disambiguation)